Liquor Licensing Board may refer to:

 Liquor Licensing Board (Hong Kong)
 Liquor Licensing Board (Northwest Territories)
 Liquor Licensing Board (Nunavut)
 Liquor Licence Board of Ontario